= List of lycaenid genera: X =

The large butterfly family Lycaenidae contains the following genera starting with the letter X:

No currently valid lycaenid genera start with an X.
